Parkville is an unincorporated community and census-designated place in Baltimore County, Maryland, United States. As of the 2010 census, the population was 30,734.

Geography
The northern border of the CDP is Interstate 695 (the Baltimore Beltway) from Loch Raven Boulevard to Putty Hill Avenue. The eastern border is roughly where Putty Hill Avenue becomes Rossville Boulevard, the southern border is the Baltimore City/Baltimore County line from near Glen Road to Loch Raven Boulevard, and the western boundary is Loch Raven Boulevard from the city line to I-695.

Demographics

At the 2000 census there were 31,118 people, 13,044 households, and 8,243 families living in the CDP. The racial makeup of the CDP was 73.64% White, 22.48% African American, 0.16% Native American, 1.88% Asian, 0.02% Pacific Islander, 0.42% from other races, and 1.39% from two or more races. Hispanic or Latino of any race were 1.65%.

Of the 13,044 households 28.3% had children under the age of 18 living with them, 42.8% were married couples living together, 16.2% had a female householder with no husband present, and 36.8% were non-families. 29.8% of households were one person and 11.1% were one person aged 65 or older. The average household size was 2.36 and the average family size was 2.93.

The age distribution was 22.8% under the age of 18, 8.9% from 18 to 24, 30.4% from 25 to 44, 20.8% from 45 to 64, and 17.1% 65 or older. The median age was 38 years. For every 100 females, there were 86.1 males. For every 100 females age 18 and over, there were 81.5 males.

The median income for a household in the CDP was $41,410, and the median family income  was $50,421. Males had a median income of $36,728 versus $27,579 for females. The per capita income for the CDP was $20,633. About 6.4% of families and 7.4% of the population were below the poverty line, including 8.9% of those under age 18 and 5.7% of those age 65 or over.

Education
People in Parkville are zoned for the following schools:

Elementary schools
 Halstead Academy
 Pine Grove Elementary
 Oakleigh Elementary
 Villa Cresta Elementary
 Harford Hills Elementary
 Carney Elementary
 Elmwood Elementary
 Pleasant Plains Elementary (in Towson)
 Seven Oaks Elementary

Middle schools
 Parkville Middle and Center of Technology
 Pine Grove Middle School
 Loch Raven Technical Academy (in Towson)

Elementary/middle schools
 Woodhome Elementary/Middle School

High schools
 Parkville High School
 Loch Raven High School (in Towson)
 Perry Hall High School (in Perry Hall)

Transportation

Roads
Some of the major roads in the Parkville area are:
Harford Road (MD-147)
Joppa Road
Old Harford Road
Perring Parkway
Putty Hill Avenue
Taylor Avenue

Public transportation
The Maryland Transit Administration's Bus Route 19 operates along Harford Road between the Carney Park-and-Ride and Downtown Baltimore.

Local culture
An annual Czech and Slovak Heritage Festival is held in Parkville to celebrate the Czech and Slovak heritage of Baltimore.

For several years, Parkville was the primary location for the music festival Stanstock, a nonprofit charity that primarily benefits two local charities, the Nicole Van Horn Foundation and the Catch a Lift Fund.

References

External links
 

 
Census-designated places in Baltimore County, Maryland
Census-designated places in Maryland